Maraveneh-ye Yek (also Romanized as Marāveneh-ye Yek; also known as Dobb ol ‘Az̄īr, Dobbol Ghadīr, and Doobé Ghadir) is a village in Anaqcheh Rural District, in the Central District of Ahvaz County, Khuzestan Province, Iran. At the 2006 census, its population was 114, in 23 families.

References 

Populated places in Ahvaz County